Whittle is an English surname. Notable people with the surname include:

Alasdair Whittle, British archaeologist specialising in the Neolithic
Albert Whittle (1877–1917), English cricketer
Alex Whittle (born 1993), English footballer
Bill Whittle (born 1959), American conservative
Brian Whittle (born 1964), Scottish Conservative politician and former international athlete
Chris Mary Francine Whittle (born 1927), Belgian composer
Chris Whittle (born 1947), American entrepreneur who founded Channel One News and Edison Schools, Inc
Daniel Webster Whittle (1840–1901), American gospel song writer
Francis McNeece Whittle (1823-1902), Episcopal bishop of Virginia
Frank Whittle (1907–1996), British RAF officer who invented the jet engine
Gwendolyn Yates Whittle (born 1961), sound editor
Harry Whittle (1922–1990), British hurdler
Jason Whittle (born 1975), American football player
Jenny Whittle (born 1973), Australian basketball player
John Woods Whittle (1882–1946), Australian soldier and recipient of the Victoria Cross
Kennon C. Whittle (1891–1967), judge, Virginia Supreme Court of Appeals
Lesley Whittle (1957–1975), English murder victim
Peter Whittle (mathematician) (1927–2021), New Zealand mathematician and statistician
Peter Whittle (politician) (born 1961), British politician, author, journalist and broadcaster
Stafford G. Whittle (1849–1931), judge, Virginia Supreme Court of Appeals
Stephen Whittle (born 1955), British transsexual activist
Thomas Whittle the Elder (1803–1887), English watercolourist
Tommy Whittle (1926–2013), British jazz saxophonist

English-language surnames